Zaman Town is a neighbourhood in the Korangi District in eastern Karachi, Pakistan. It was previously part of Korangi Town, which was an administrative unit that was disbanded in 2011.

Neighbourhoods
 Zaman Town
 Labour Square
 Bengali Para
 Sector 34
 Area 1
 Area 2
 Area 3

References

External links 
 Karachi website

Neighbourhoods of Karachi
Korangi Town